Itapuca is a Brazilian municipality in the state of Rio Grande do Sul.

It is located at 28º53'43" S latitude and 52º02'12" W longitude, with an elevation of 660 meters above sea level. Its population in 2020 was estimated at 2,065 inhabitants. It has a surface area of 184.48 km².

References

Municipalities in Rio Grande do Sul